The 1983–84 Pittsburgh Panthers men's basketball team represented the University of Pittsburgh in the 1983–84 NCAA Division I men's basketball season. Led by head coach Roy Chipman, the Panthers finished with a record of 18–13. They were invited to the 1984 National Invitation Tournament where they lost in the quarterfinal round to Notre Dame.

References

Pittsburgh Panthers men's basketball seasons
Pittsburgh
Pittsburgh Pan
Pittsburgh Pan